Urziceni is a city in Ialomița County, Muntenia, Romania, located around 60 km north-east of Bucharest. It has a population of 14,053: 93.1% Romanians,  4.6% Roma and 1.6% Hungarians.

Demographics

As the census of 2011 results shows, Urziceni is ranked in 3rd place in Ialomița County, after Slobozia and Fetești with 14053 stable residents, there are  6765 males and 7288 females.

Origins

Founded by Romanian shepherds, its name is derived from the word "urzică" (nettle). It was mentioned for the first time in a written document on 23 April 1596, during the reign of Mihai Viteazul. It gained in 1831 the status of market town and in 1895 the city status. For 117 years, it was the capital of Ialomița County (between 1716 and 1833).

Soccer Record
A little town by any standards, Urziceni is perhaps best known for its football team, Unirea Urziceni. Urziceni holds the record for the smallest town to have a team in the Champions League. The team wound up a year later.

References

External links

 Urziceni.ro
 Mesagerul de Urziceni

Populated places in Ialomița County
Localities in Muntenia
Cities in Romania